Cylindronotum is a genus of beetles in the family Carabidae, containing the following species:

 Cylindronotum aeneum Putzeys, 1845
 Cylindronotum chalceum (Kirsch, 1873)
 Cylindronotum crenulatum (Chaudoir, 1872)
 Cylindronotum cursorium Chaudoir, 1848
 Cylindronotum lissonotum (Chaudoir, 1872)
 Cylindronotum nevermanni Emden, 1949
 Cylindronotum reichei (Chaudoir, 1872)

References

Lebiinae